Maa Daivam is a 1976 Indian Telugu-language drama film, produced by Maniyan and Vidyas Lakshman under the Udayam Productions banner and directed by S. S. Balan. The film stars N. T. Rama Rao and Jayachitra, with music composed by K. V. Mahadevan. It is a remake of the Hindi film Do Aankhen Barah Haath (1957).

Plot 
Raju is a jail warden who decides to rehabilitate six notorious prisoners by releasing them on parole. The government approves it on an ultimatum that Raju will be arrested if even one of the prisoners escapes. He takes them to a dilapidated country farm and makes them work hard with kindly guidance as they eventually produce a great harvest. They all come across Saroja, an itinerant seller after they save her from a corrupt businessman Govinda Swamy. As Saroja is homeless, the six prisoners plead with Raju to let the girl stay with them and he agrees.

Naganna, one of the prisoners, coincidentally runs into his long-lost family, he tearfully reunites with them. But they appear homeless, and so Raju allows them also to stay with them, which angers the other prisoners who feel that Raju did not give them freedom, compelling them to try killing him in order to escape. They plan to kill Raju through one of the prisoners, Simhadri, a barber using a trick to cut his neck while shaving, but Simhadri sees Raju's magical eyes and gets hypnotised, thus compelling him to abort the idea of murder. The prisoners who are attempting to escape see a statue of Venkateswara in a temple and because they see Raju's spirit in it, they get hypnotised and eventually return.

The prisoners gradually turn into good people and become attached to Raju, who dreams of marrying Saroja, in his mother's presence. One day, Raju sends the prisoners to the market for selling vegetables cultivated by them. There, Govinda Swamy and his henchmen mix up alcohol in their tea; while they return in a drunken state, they attack Raju and Saroja. Raju is not pleased with their status and commands them to kill him if that is what they want. Hypnotism and conscience again strike the prisoners, causing them to drop their weapons. The next morning, the prisoners fall at Raju's feet and earn the forgiveness of both Raju and Saroja.

Later, Govinda Swamy orders that Raju and prisoners surrender, or else their plantation and home will be destroyed. Raju refuses, so the Govinda Swamy sends his thugs and elephants to destroy everything in sight. However, Raju and his men vigorously battle all the thugs and emerge victorious, while the local police capture the corrupt. Raju, having been praised for transforming the six prisoners into reformed people, frees the prisoners and tearfully sees them off.

Cast 

N. T. Rama Rao as Raju
Jayachitra as Saroja
Nagabhushanam as Simhadri
Giri Babu as Govinda Swamy
M. N. Nambiar as Bhairavudu
Padmanabham as Sanyassi
Prabhakar Reddy as Naganna
Rajanala as Superintendent
Pandari Bai as Raju's mother
Thyagaraju as David
Bheema Raju as Khadar
K. V. Chalam as Gopala Swamy
Balakrishna as Veeranna
Chalapathi Rao as Prisoner No. 108
Jagga Rao

Soundtrack 
The soundtrack was composed by K. V. Mahadevan.

References

External links 
 

Films scored by K. V. Mahadevan
Indian drama films
Telugu remakes of Hindi films
1970s Telugu-language films
1976 drama films